Javier Adolfo Carriqueo Inostroza (born 29 May 1979 in San Martín de los Andes) is an Argentine middle and long-distance runner. At the 2012 Summer Olympics, he competed in the Men's 5000 metres, finishing 36th overall in Round 1, failing to qualify for the final.

Personal bests
800 m: 1:45.32 –  Getafe, 10 July 2003
1500 m: 3:38.62 –  Río de Janeiro, 25 July 2007
3000 m: 7:49.54 –  Mataró, 4 August 2009
5000 m: 13:25.17 –  Barcelona, 22 July 2011
10,000 m: 29:06.04 –  Buenos Aires, 5 June 2011

Competition record

References

External links
 
 
 
 
 Tilastopaja biography

1979 births
Living people
Argentine male long-distance runners
Argentine male middle-distance runners
Olympic athletes of Argentina
Athletes (track and field) at the 2008 Summer Olympics
Athletes (track and field) at the 2012 Summer Olympics
Pan American Games competitors for Argentina
Athletes (track and field) at the 2003 Pan American Games
Athletes (track and field) at the 2007 Pan American Games
Athletes (track and field) at the 2011 Pan American Games
South American Games bronze medalists for Argentina
South American Games medalists in athletics
Athletes (track and field) at the 2018 South American Games
People from Neuquén Province